Albert Watt Hobt Sr. (October 1, 1893 – October 2, 1963) was an American football and basketball coach. He served as the head football coach and head basketball coach at the University of Toledo from 1919 to 1920.  Prior to his stint at Toledo, he served as the head basketball coach at Wittenberg College—now known as Wittenberg University—in Springfield, Ohio during the 1917–18 season.

Hobt moved to Knoxville, Tennessee, where he served as a long-time physical education faculty member at the University of Tennessee. He served as an assistant coach for the Tennessee Volunteers football team from 1921 to 1925.

Head coaching record

Football

References

External links
 

1893 births
1963 deaths
American football halfbacks
Basketball coaches from Ohio
College men's basketball head coaches in the United States
Ohio State Buckeyes football players
Tennessee Volunteers football coaches
Toledo Rockets football coaches
Toledo Rockets men's basketball coaches
Wittenberg Tigers football coaches
Wittenberg Tigers men's basketball coaches
University of Tennessee faculty
People from Wellston, Ohio
Players of American football from Ohio